Yahara may refer to:

Hiromichi Yahara (1902-1981), an Imperial Japanese Army officer
Mikio Yahara (b. 1947), a Japanese karate expert and instructor
The Yahara River in Wisconsin in the United States
The USS Yahara, a gasoline tanker that served in the United States Navy from 1944 to 1946